Interstate 180 (I-180) is a spur highway in Pennsylvania that connects Williamsport to I-80 near Milton. It was also the designation of present-day I-176 between Morgantown and Reading, when the Pennsylvania Turnpike carried the "I-80S" designation in the 1960s. It is signed as an east–west route for its entire length, even though half of the route runs north–south.

Route description

I-180 begins along the banks of the West Branch Susquehanna River in Williamsport, at an interchange with US Route 15 (US 15) and US 220. The highway begins running concurrently along these routes.

At exit 27A, US 15 leaves the overlap running south across the Carl E. Stotz Memorial Little League Bridge, and I-180 continues eastward, still concurrent with US 220 northbound. From there, I-180 runs along the West Branch Susquehanna River until the highway reaches the eastern suburbs of Williamsport, where US 220 leaves the Interstate via exit 15.

From US 220 to the eastern terminus, I-180 is aligned north–south, though the highway is signed east–west. I-180 terminates at an interchange with I-80, and the freeway continues as Pennsylvania Route 147 (PA 147).

History
I-180 was designated in January 1984 and was signed concurrently with US 220 between US 15 in Williamsport and Pennsdale and replaced PA 147 between US 220 in Pennsdale and I-80 near Milton.

Exit list

See also

References

External links

 I-180 on Kurumi.com
 Interstate Guide - I-180
 Pennsylvania Highways: Interstate 180
 I-180 at AARoads.com
 Pennsylvania Roads - I-180

80-1 Pennsylvania
80-1
1 Pennsylvania
Transportation in Lycoming County, Pennsylvania
Transportation in Northumberland County, Pennsylvania